O-2113 is a drug that is a classical cannabinoid derivative, which acts as a potent agonist for cannabinoid receptors, producing sedation, hypothermia and analgesia in animal studies.

See also
 O-2050
 O-2372
 O-2545

References

Benzochromenes
Cannabinoids